Slate Esports (abbreviated as SLT) is a Singaporean Esports organization under Avium Esports. It has competitive team in Mobile Legends: Bang Bang. Slate Esports consists of former members of EVOS SG, who competed in M3 and achieved top 4 in global standings.

Mobile Legends: Bang Bang

MPL Singapore

Season 4 
Previously known as EVOS SG, Slate lineup included Adammir, Gear, JPLand Seilah. Joxx and Nick were replaced by FMM and Jae. The team went on to place 2nd in the Regular Season. They subsequently finished 2nd in the Playoffs, after a 3-4 defeat to rivals RSG SG.

Roster

Tournament results

Mobile Legends: Bang Bang Professional League (MPL)

References

External links 
 Facebook

2022 establishments in Singapore
Esports teams based in Singapore
Esports teams established in 2022
Mobile Legends: Bang Bang teams